The Canton Corner Historic District is a historic district encompassing the historic town center of Canton, Massachusetts. The district was added to the National Register of Historic Places on September 9, 2009.

Description and history
The town of Canton, located south of Boston, Massachusetts, was first settled in the 17th century by English colonial settlers involved in the Ponkapoag native "praying town", but its center of development moved to the southwest in the 18th century due to the higher quality of farmland there.  Washington Street, the main east-west road through the district, was laid out in 1700 and Pleasant Street in 1723, running south from Washington Street across a dam that impounded Pequid Brook, the southern extent of the district, to form Reservoir Pond.  The town's first colonial meetinghouse was built at Canton Corner in 1707, and its town hall was built there in 1824.

The district extends from east to west along Washington Street, from Dedham Street to the Canton Corner Cemetery, and south along Pleasant Street to Pequid Brook.  The district includes housing spanning more than 250 years of architectural styles, from Georgian (e.g. the c. 1725 David Tilden House at 93 Pleasant Street) to the Craftsman/Bungalow style (e.g. the 1905 Bessie Estey House at 1452 Washington Street).  Its oldest public building is the 1824 First Congregational Parish Church, built in 1824; it is a late Federal period building with both Greek and Gothic Revival features.  A particularly fine example of Italianate architecture is the John Williams House at 18 Dedham Street.

Gallery

See also
National Register of Historic Places listings in Norfolk County, Massachusetts

References

Historic districts in Norfolk County, Massachusetts
Canton, Massachusetts
National Register of Historic Places in Norfolk County, Massachusetts
Historic districts on the National Register of Historic Places in Massachusetts